Md Kamran is an Indian politician and a member of the Bihar Legislative Assembly. He won from the Gobindpur over the Rashtriya Janata Dal symbol in the 2020 Bihar Legislative Assembly election(Roh).

External links

• MD Kamran on Twitter

• MD Kamran on Facebook

• MD Kamran on Instagram

• MD Kamran on LinkedIn

References 

Bihar MLAs 2020–2025
Year of birth missing (living people)
Living people
Rashtriya Janata Dal politicians